Slovak National Party Youth (Mládež SNS) is a Slovak nationalist youth organization in Slovakia, and is a branch of the Slovak National Party. The organization in its current form was founded in 2014.

References

External links 
 Official Facebook page of Mládež SNS 

Youth wings of political parties in Slovakia
Youth wings of conservative parties